Shibaragatti is a village in Dharwad district of Karnataka, India.

Demographics 
As of the 2011 Census of India there were 346 households in Shibaragatti and a total population of 1,986 consisting of 1,003 males and 983 females. There were 282 children ages 0-6.

References

Villages in Dharwad district